The 1980 Grand National (officially known as The Sun Grand National for sponsorship reasons) was the 134th renewal of the Grand National horse race that took place at Aintree Racecourse near Liverpool, England, on 29 March 1980. The race, which carried the title, the World's greatest steeplechase, was won by Ben Nevis, ridden by the American amateur rider Charlie Fenwick. Only 4 horses finished the race out of 30 starters.

Finishing order

Non-finishers

Media coverage

The twenty-first Grand National covered live on the BBC in a Grandstand special presented by David Coleman.

References

External links

 1980
Grand National
Grand National
20th century in Merseyside
Grand national